The National Human Rights Society, better known locally by its acronym HAKAM, is a human rights non-governmental organisation (NGO) that works on human rights issues in Malaysia. HAKAM is considered to be one of the most vocal human rights NGOs in Malaysia. Anyone who is at least 18 years of age and a Malaysia citizen can be a member. There is a new member and renewal membership form.

References

External links 
 
 

1991 establishments in Malaysia
Human rights organisations based in Malaysia